The 1897 College Football All-America team is composed of college football players who were selected as All-Americans for the 1897 college football season, as selected by Walter Camp for Harper's Weekly. Caspar Whitney had selected the Harper's Weekly All-American Team from 1891 to 1896, but Whitney was on a world's sports tour during the 1897 season, and Camp therefore substituted for Whitney.

All-American selections for 1897

Key
 WC = Walter Camp for Harper's Weekly
 OUT = Outing Magazine
 NYS = New York Sun
 LES = Leslie's Weekly by W. T. Bull
 Bold = Consensus All-American

Ends
 Garrett Cochran, Princeton (WC-1; OUT-1; NYS-1; LES-1)
 John A. Hall, Yale (WC-1; OUT-2; NYS-2; LES-2)
 Sam Boyle, Penn (WC-2; OUT-1; LES-1)
 William McKeever, Cornell (WC-2)
 John Babcock Moulton, Harvard (WC-3; NYS-1)
 Lyndon S. Tracy, Cornell (WC-3)
 Norman Cabot, Harvard (NYS-2; LES-2)
 Craig, Princeton (NYS-2)
 Josiah J. Hazen, Yale (OUT-2)

Tackles

 Burr Chamberlain, Yale (WC-1; OUT-1; NYS-1; LES-1)
 John H. Outland, Penn (Namesake of the Outland Trophy and College Football Hall of Fame) (WC-1; LES-1)
 James O. Rodgers, Yale (WC-2; OUT-1; NYS-2; LES-2)
 Wallace B. Scales, Army (WC-2; NYS-2)
 Art Hillebrand, Princeton (College Football Hall of Fame) (WC-3; OUT-2; NYS-1)
 Malcolm Donald, Harvard (WC-3)
 S. M. Goodman, Penn (OUT-2)
 Chester Odiorne Swain, Harvard (LES-2)

Guards
 Truxtun Hare, Penn (WC; HW; NYS-1; LES-2)
 Gordon Brown, Yale (College Football Hall of Fame) (WC; HW; NYS-2; LES-1)
 Charles Chadwick, Yale (WC-2; OUT-2; LES-1)
 Charles Rinehart, Lafayette (College Football Hall of Fame) (WC-2; OUT-1)
 George Winthrop Bouve, Harvard (WC-3; OUT-1; NYS-1; LES-2)
 Josiah McCracken, Penn (WC-3; OUT-2)
 Edwards, Princeton (NYS-2)

Centers
 Allan Doucette, Harvard (WC-1; OUT-2; NYS-1; LES-2)
 George Cadwalader, Yale (WC-2; OUT-1; LES-1)
 Pete Overfield, Penn (WC-3)

Quarterbacks
 Charles de Saulles, Yale (WC-1; NYS-1; LES-1)
 George Young, Cornell (WC-2; OUT-1)
 John Baird, Princeton (WC-3; OUT-2; NYS-1 [as fb]; LES-2)
 Leon Kromer, Army (NYS-2)
 David Weeks, Penn (NYS-2)

Halfbacks
 Benjamin Dibblee, Harvard (WC-1; OUT-1; NYS-1; LES-2)
 Addison Kelly, Princeton (WC-1; OUT-1; NYS-2; LES-2)
 Dave Fultz, Brown (WC-2; OUT-2; NYS-1; LES-1)
 William F. Nesbitt, Army (WC-2)
 William Bannard, Princeton (WC-3; NYS-2)
 George B. Walbridge, Lafayette (WC-3)
 Charles T. Dudley, Yale (OUT-2; NYS-2)

Fullbacks
 John Minds, Penn (College Football Hall of Fame) (WC-1; OUT-1; NYS-2; LES-1)
 Malcolm McBride, Yale (WC-2; NYS-2; LES-2)
 Powell Wheeler, Princeton (WC-3; LES-1)
 Edward G. Bray, Lafayette (OUT-2)

References

All-America Team
College Football All-America Teams